A chab chab is a piece of jewellery which wealthy Tibetan ladies attached to their clothes beneath the right shoulder. It consists of a brooch like main part to which various small utensils are attached with small chains. Among the utensils are found such instruments as a toothpick, a small spoon for cleaning the ears, pincers and knives for manicure. Normally the main part a chab chab is made from hammered silver, while the attachments are from cast silver and are often engraved with decorative designs; occasionally a chab chab can be made partly or completely of gold.

References

Tibetan art
Jewellery